Glenwood is an unincorporated community in Floyd County, in the U.S. state of Georgia.

History
Glenwood took its name from the nearby estate of Augustus Wright.

References

Unincorporated communities in Floyd County, Georgia
Unincorporated communities in Georgia (U.S. state)